The Rauen Hills are a range of low hills in Brandenburg, Germany. They are named after the town of Rauen.

Hills of Brandenburg
Regions of Brandenburg